Perlat Musta (born 15 October 1958) is an Albanian former football goalkeeper. He has been considered by many pundits in Albania as one of the greatest goalkeepers in Albania. In December 2018 he was honoured for his services to Albanian football, alongside Edvin Murati and Qamil Teliti.

Early life
Perlat Musta was born in Vlorë on 15 October 1958 into a family which did not have "strong" connections with football. He began to show his liking for football at the age of 10, and unlike his coevals, Musta's favourite position was goalkeeper.

Club career
Musta was a product of Partizani Tirana academy, and was promoted to senior squad in 1979 and went on to play there until 1991. In January 1991, he scored from the penalty spot in a league match against Luftëtari. He left Albania in 1991 like many Albanians following the fall of communism, joining Romanian side Dinamo București. He failed to establish himself as a regular at Dinamo because of the two Romanian international goalkeepers, Florin Prunea and Florin Tene.

He played only two matches in his first season at Ştefan cel Mare in his first season, but he managed to win his first and only Champion of Romania title. He was loaned to Progresul București, but returned to Dinamo București. In 1994 he returned to Partizani Tirana where he played as starter in the next two seasons and also served as goalkeeper Coach.

International career
Musta had a successful youth international career, winning Balkan Youth Championship twice in 1978 and 1981.

He made his senior debut for Albania in a September 1981 FIFA World Cup qualification match against Finland and earned a total of 23 caps, scoring no goals.

His final international was a June 1993 World Cup qualification against Denmark. He was also once the captain of the team in a match against Romania, which took place in 1987 on the Steaua Stadium.

International career statistics
Source:

Personal life
His daughter Aulona Musta is an Albanian blogger and social media celebrity.

Honours

Club
Partizani Tirana
Albanian Superliga: 1978–79, 1980–81, 1986–87
Albanian Cup: 1979–80, 1990–91
Dinamo București
Liga I: 1991–92

International
Albania U21
Balkan Youth Championship: 1978, 1981

References

External links
 
 
 
 Scoreshelf profile

1964 births
Living people
Footballers from Vlorë
Albanian footballers
Association football goalkeepers
Albania international footballers
FK Partizani Tirana players
FC Dinamo București players
FC Progresul București players
Liga I players
Albanian expatriate footballers
Expatriate footballers in Romania
Albanian expatriate sportspeople in Romania
Albanian football managers
FK Partizani Tirana managers
FC Kamza managers